North Vernon Municipal Airport  is a public airport  northeast of North Vernon, in Jennings County, Indiana. The airport was founded as St. Anne AAF in February 1944 and given to the City of North Vernon in 1948.

References

External links 

 http://www.nvair.org/index.php
 http://www.airnav.com/airport/KOVO

Airports in Indiana
Transportation buildings and structures in Jennings County, Indiana